Turgay Doğan (born February 14, 1984, in Tokat) is a Turkish volleyball player. He is currently a player of the Fenerbahçe Grundig. He also played for Tokat Belediye Plevne, Maliye Milli Piyango SK, Galatasaray and Mef Okulları. Doğan currently plays for Adana Toros at the Turkish Volleyball 2nd League.

References

1984 births
Living people
Turkish men's volleyball players
Fenerbahçe volleyballers